

Hans Rauch (1 March 1899 – 22 August 1958) was a general in the Luftwaffe of Nazi Germany during World War II. He was a recipient of the Knight's Cross of the Iron Cross.

Awards and decorations

 Knight's Cross of the Iron Cross on 6 December 1944 as Oberst and commander of Flak-Sturm-Regiment 41 (mot)

References

Citations

Bibliography

 

1899 births
1958 deaths
Luftwaffe World War II generals
Recipients of the Knight's Cross of the Iron Cross
Major generals of the Luftwaffe
People from Zgorzelec County